Frode Bjerkholt (10 March 1894 – 25 February 1974) was a Norwegian footballer. He played in one match for the Norway national football team in 1913.

References

External links
 
 

1894 births
1974 deaths
Norwegian footballers
Norway international footballers
People from Larvik
Association football defenders
Larvik Turn players